Bilsthorpe is a village and civil parish in the Newark and Sherwood district of Nottinghamshire, England.   According to the 2001 census it had a population of 3,076, increasing to 3,375 at the 2011 Census. It is located near the junction of the A614 and A617, around 5 miles south of Ollerton, 9 miles east of Mansfield and 6 miles north-west of Southwell.

Facilities
The village has 2 children's play-parks as well as a small-sized duck pond. It has also a members-only fishing lake created from the remains of the old colliery slag heap.

The village is known locally as being two areas, the 'old' and 'new'. The village has two public houses (Copper Beech and Stanton Arms) and a miners' welfare club. The village used to have a village hall with squash and sauna facilities with some gym equipment. However, the district council of Newark decided to close these due mainly to the low usage of both the squash and sauna facilities. The old squash centre site has now been turned into a Miners Museum. The village hall's main part is still in use for coffee mornings, and other community gatherings including a bowls event for local people. 

Bilsthorpe parish church is the Grade I listed St Margaret's Church. 
 
Bilsthorpe Moor is to the south of the village. There was a supported-living home for adults with learning disabilities and autism called LifeWays which closed in 2019.

Bilsthorpe Flying High Academy is the local education facility for children with access to nursery and primary learning. Part of The Flying High Trust, a multi-school organisation based in Cotgrave, Nottinghamshire, it opened for Autumn term 2015 and was previously known as Crompton View Primary School.

Access to secondary education is in Ollerton.

Former colliery and memorials

The village's colliery closed in 1997 after 70 years in use. The colliery was the centre of national media and public attention on 18 August 1993 when a roof collapsed in the colliery, killing 31-year-old under-manager David Shelton and miners Bill McCulloch (aged 26) and Peter Alcock (aged 50). David Shelton was posthumously awarded the George Medal for bravery on 11 October 1995 for aiding the rescue of other miners; survivor Ray Thompson also received the George Medal.

A memorial in the form of an  miners lamp carved from sandstone having the names of 77 deceased workers dating back to 1927 was established in 2011.

A memorial to dead miners was also erected outside of the colliery site.

Sport
Bilsthorpe Welfare Youth Football Club won the Mansfield Youth Under 16s Division 2 football championship. BWYFC Bilsthorpe is also the home of non-league football club Nottingham United, one of the biggest semi-professional clubs in the county, currently playing at Step 7 of the National League System and based at Bilsthorpe Sports Ground on Eakring Road. NUFC

Transport
Stagecoach in Mansfield operate one bus route
Sherwood Arrow which links Bilsthorpe with Nottingham and Ollerton and Worksop/Retford operated by Stagecoach Bassetlaw
28B which links the village with Mansfield and Eakring

See also
Listed buildings in Bilsthorpe

References

External links

Bilsthorpe News & Online Community
Bilsthorpe Village
 Bilsthorpe village viewed on google maps
photograph of Bilsthorpe colliery

 
Villages in Nottinghamshire
Civil parishes in Nottinghamshire
Newark and Sherwood